HMS Scout  was a  in service 1857-77.

Service
HMS Scout was wooden screw corvette launched on 30 December 1856 at Woolwich Dockyard. She struck an uncharted rock in the Pacific Ocean on 12 August 1866. Repairs cost £1,087. A Court of Enquiry acquitted her commander. She was broken up in 1877.

References

External links

 

1856 ships
Pearl-class corvettes
Ships built in Woolwich
Maritime incidents in August 1866